This list of University of Utah people includes notable alumni, non-graduate former students, faculty, staff, and former university presidents. The University of Utah, located in Salt Lake City, Utah, is a flagship public space-grant research university. The school is notable for having been one of the first four nodes of the ARPANET and the first node outside of California, as well as forming the first computer graphics research group.

The University of Utah offers more than 100 undergraduate majors and more than 92 graduate degree programs, and includes three professional graduate schools: the University of Utah School of Medicine, the David Eccles School of Business, and the S.J. Quinney College of Law. The enrollment for 2016 was 23,789 undergraduate and 8,071 graduate students, with 1,505 full-time faculty members and 5,230 staff.

Notable alumni

Law and government

Business

Humanities and fine arts

Life and physical sciences

Mathematics
Richard Eliot Chamberlin – geometric topologist, visiting scholar at the Institute for Advanced Study, and Invited Speaker at the International Congress of Mathematicians
 Alessio Corti – geometer at Imperial College London and winner of the London Mathematical Society Whitehead Prize
 John E. Dennis – editor-in-chief and founder of the SIAM Journal on Optimization, pioneered convergence analysis of quasi-Newton methods
 Gordana Matic – geometric topologist, C. L. E. Moore instructor at MIT, Fellow of the American Mathematical Society

Computer science

Engineering

Medicine

Media

Education

Athletics

 Sharrieff Shah –  Husband to Jen Shah, American Football Coach

Music and entertainment
 Jen Shah – Reality TV star on The Real Housewives of Salt Lake City
 Peter Breinholt – folk recording artist
 Matthew Davis – actor noted for roles in Legally Blonde and The Vampire Diaries
 Dan Farr – co-founder of Salt Lake Comic Con and technology entrepreneur
Denali Foxx, born Cordero Zuckerman – American Drag Performer, contestant on the thirteenth season of RuPaul's Drag Race
Kaskade, born Ryan Raddon – DJ
 Steven Sharp Nelson – cellist, member of The Piano Guys
 Josh Rosenthal – performing singer/songwriter

Religion

Criminals
 Ted Bundy – notorious serial killer; briefly attended Utah's law school prior to his 1975 arrest and conviction for kidnapping
 Thad Roberts – former NASA intern who stole and attempted to resell the collection of Apollo program moon rocks valued at $21 million
 Nadir Soofi – Islamic extremist who attacked officers with gunfire at the entrance to an exhibit featuring cartoon images of Muhammad at the Curtis Culwell Center in Garland, Texas, on May 3, 2015.

Notable faculty

Humanities and fine arts

Life and physical sciences

Mathematics

Engineering and computer science

Medicine

Economics and political science
 Dean Baker (born 1958) - macroeconomist
 Russell W. Belk – professor of business administration and expert in art consumer and collector behavior
 Virginia Cutler – served on the White House Consumer Committee, as technical advisor in home economics education for the US International Cooperation Administration and the Point Four Program; dean of the home economics department; developed the home science program at the University of Ghana
 E. K. Hunt – Emeritus Professor of Economics; expert on political economy; author of History of Economic Thought: A Critical Perspective
Minqi Li – renowned political economist
 Patrick Shea – professor of political science, biology, and lawyer noted for taking on cases related to freedom of the press, represented the Massachusetts Democratic Party in seeking to gain enough information to exclude Mitt Romney from running for governor in Massachusetts, was included in Brent Jeffs's legal counsel in the sexual molestation suit against Warren Jeffs, chairman of the Utah Democratic Party, and served as national director of the Bureau of Land Management

Social and behavioral sciences
Lisa M. Diamond – developmental psychologist noted for her work in sexual orientation development, sexual identity and bonding
Ed Diener – social psychologist who pioneered the field of subjective well-being

Sports
 Greg Marsden – current coach of the women's gymnastics team coach marsden retired 2015
 Kyle Whittingham – current coach of the football team

Other
 Maud Babcock – first female member of the university's faculty
 E. Keith Eddington – artist and graphic designer
 Joseph F. Merrill – first native Utahn to receive a PhD, first principal of the College of Engineering, and creator of the LDS Institutes of Religion program
 Yehua Dennis Wei - Professor of Geography

University presidents

See also
University of Utah
University of Utah College of Engineering
University of Utah School of Medicine
David Eccles School of Business
S.J. Quinney College of Law

References

University of Utah people
University of Utah people